The Anglican Diocese of Ikwo is one of 12 within the Anglican Province of Enugu, itself one of 14 provinces within the Church of Nigeria. The current bishop is Kenneth Ifemene

Notes

Church of Nigeria dioceses
Dioceses of the Province of Enugu